Vengelovka is a rural locality (a settlement) in Priozyornoye Rural Settlement, Pallasovsky District, Volgograd Oblast, Russia. The population was 536 as of 2010. There are 5 streets.

Geography 
Vengelovka is located on the Caspian Depression, 94 km south of Pallasovka (the district's administrative centre) by road. Put Ilyicha is the nearest rural locality.

References 

Rural localities in Pallasovsky District